Sardi-ye Shahabad (also Romanized as Sardī-ye Shāhābād; also known as Sardī) is a village in Nehzatabad Rural District, in the Central District of Rudbar-e Jonubi County, Kerman Province, Iran. At the 2006 census, its population was 916, in 169 families.

References 

Populated places in Rudbar-e Jonubi County